Rickard Deasy PC (1812 – 6 May 1883) was an Irish lawyer and judge.

He was born at Phale Court, Enniskean, County Cork, the second son of Rickard Deasy, a wealthy brewer, and his wife Mary Anne Caller. He was educated at the Trinity College Dublin, where he graduated with a Doctorate of Law. He was called to the Irish Bar, and became Queen's Counsel. He practised mainly on the Munster Circuit, and quickly became one of its leaders.

He married Monica O'Connor, youngest daughter of Hugh O'Connor of Dublin, and had three children, of whom two died young. His only surviving son was Henry Hugh Peter Deasy (1866-1947), the soldier and writer, author of In Tibet and Chinese Turkestan, and founder of the Deasy Motor Car Company. Henry in turn was the father of the agricultural campaigner Rickard Deasy.

Deasy was elected as Member of Parliament for County Cork on 23 April 1855 in a by-election following Edmond Roche's elevation to the peerage. He was appointed Third Serjeant-at-law in 1858, then Solicitor-General for Ireland in 1859 and then Attorney-General for Ireland in 1860, being also appointed to the Irish Privy Council (on 21 February). On the death of Richard Wilson Greene in 1861 Deasy was raised to the bench as a Baron of the Exchequer. He was appointed to the Irish Court of Appeal in 1878, and served on that court until his death in 1883. He was buried in the family vault in Deans Grange Cemetery, beside his wife, who had died a few weeks earlier.

He was a fine lawyer, especially in the field of equity: as a barrister, he was noted for identifying himself fully with his clients' interests. He was also an effective Parliamentarian, concise and professional in his dispatch of Government business. His name is permanently associated with the Landlord and Tenant Law Amendment (Ireland) Act 1860, universally known as Deasy's Act, which as Attorney General he steered through Parliament.

Arms

References

 F. Elrington Ball, The Judges in Ireland 1221–1921, John Murray, London 1926

External links 
 

1812 births
1883 deaths
UK MPs 1852–1857
UK MPs 1857–1859
UK MPs 1859–1865
Burials at Deans Grange Cemetery
Members of the Parliament of the United Kingdom for County Cork constituencies (1801–1922)
Members of the Privy Council of Ireland
People from County Cork
Lords Justice of Appeal for Ireland
Serjeants-at-law (Ireland)
19th-century Irish judges
19th-century Irish lawyers
Alumni of Trinity College Dublin